The Berkeley Carroll School is a coed independent college prep school in New York City. Located in Park Slope, Brooklyn, it has a Lower School (preK – grade 4), Middle School (grades 5–8) and Upper School (grades 9–12).

History 
The Berkeley Carroll School was officially chartered by the New York state government on April 12, 1886, as a school for "the education of young ladies". Within a decade, boys were being admitted to the kindergarten through fourth grade. The school went fully co-educational in 1974.

Academics 
The school has three educational divisions, from preschool through high school. The Lower School, with preschool through grade four, focuses on the fundamentals of reading, writing, math, science, technology, the arts, and social studies. In 2012, the Lower School started a Spanish partial-immersion program, in which all classes are partially taught in Spanish to help students become comfortable hearing and speaking Spanish at an early age.

The Middle School, grades five through eight, promotes social and intellectual growth with an academic program that includes science, humanities, math, physical education, the arts, Spanish, and speech and debate. Every fifth and sixth grader learns to play a wind and/or string instrument and performs in concerts for the community. In 2016, the Middle School math team (the Quantifyin' Lions) won the Brooklyn MathCounts competition and the Middle and Upper School speech & debate teams won many awards at the state and local level.

In the Upper School, grades nine through twelve, academic programs include English, science, math, history, computer science, the arts, world language, and speech and debate. Additionally, the Upper School has partnerships with NYU's Tandon School of Engineering, which provides engineering classes for Berkeley Carroll students, and Johns Hopkins University's Center for Talented Youth, which offers students online Mandarin and Arabic courses.

Athletics
The school is a member of the New York State Association of Independent Schools Athletic Association. The 2006–2007 girls varsity basketball team beat Dwight to become the champions of the ACIS (Athletic Conference of Independent Schools) league. On May 20, 2009, Berkeley Carroll won its first NYSAISAA baseball title, beating defending state champion Poly Prep 4-1.

Berkeley Carroll promotes fitness, sportsmanship, leadership, and responsibility through their athletic programs. Their athletic facilities include a 75-foot swimming pool, two full-size gyms, a mezzanine area for fitness and strength-training, and two play yards. 82% of Middle School students and 72% of Upper School students play a sport.

Interscholastic sports competition begins in 7th grade; the school fields more than 40 varsity and JV teams over three seasons including: 
Basketball
Baseball
Soccer
Volleyball
Swimming
Cross Country
Tennis
Track
Softball
Ultimate Frisbee
Flag Football

The school belongs to three competitive leagues at the Upper School level: ACIS, PSAA and AAIS.  Some of Berkeley Carroll peer institutions are Saint Ann's, Packer Collegiate, Poly Prep, Brooklyn Friends, Friends Seminary, Horace Mann, Spence, Brearley, Dalton and others.

Lower and Middle School students have intramural sports programs including:
Tennis
Fencing
Swimming
Soccer
Judo
Bowling
Gymnastics

Recognition
Berkeley Carroll was named a School of the Future by the National Association of Independent Schools in 2012.

In 2016, New York Magazine called Berkeley Carroll "the Harvard of Brooklyn's K-12 institutions."

Berkeley Carroll's STEAM initiative and focus on the role of technology in education has received national attention. In 2016, Mashable called its visit to a sixth grade coding class “a riveting experience” and in 2014, The New York Times quoted Middle School Director Jim Shapiro on helping students unplug occasionally.

The GRAMMY Foundation chose Berkeley Carroll Arts Director Peter Holsberg as the only NYC semifinalist for its 2016 Music Educator Award.

Notable alumni
 Fabiano Caruana '10 – Chess grandmaster
 Helen Gahagan Douglas '20 – Congresswoman and actress
 Margaret Farrar '16 – New York Times crossword puzzle editor from 1942–1968
 Maxine Greene '34 – Educational philosopher, author, and social activist
Karla Jay '64 – Professor and gay rights activist
 Rebecca Naomi Jones '99 – Actress
 Lucette Lagnado '73 – Journalist
 Lois Lowry '54 – Author
 Adam Ottavino '03 – professional baseball player
 Robb Paller '11 - American-Israeli baseball player
 Sarah Paulson – Actress
 Dorothy Sarnoff '31 – Operatic soprano, musical theater actress, and self-help guru

References
Notes

External links

 Berkeley Carroll School website

Park Slope
Private elementary schools in Brooklyn
Private middle schools in Brooklyn
Private high schools in Brooklyn
Private K-12 schools in New York City
Educational institutions established in 1982
1982 establishments in New York City